504 Boyz were an American hip hop group from New Orleans, Louisiana, named for the New Orleans area code.

The original 504 Boyz, Master P (as "Nino Brown"), Mystikal (as "G. Money"), Silkk The Shocker (as "Vito"), C-Murder, and Krazy, released their first album, 'Goodfellas' in 2000. It included the hit single "Wobble Wobble", a "bounce-flavored song" which peaked at #17 in the U.S.

In 2002 C-Murder was arrested for murdering a fan and Mystikal for the rape and extortion of his hairdresser. They were replaced by Choppa, Currensy, Magic, and T-Bo on the 2002 album Ballers, which produced a minor hit single Tight Whips.

After Hurricane Katrina hit New Orleans in 2005, 504 Boyz released a benefit compilation We Gon Bounce Back, their third and final album.

Discography

Studio albums

Singles

References

External links
504 Boyz at AllMusic

American hip hop groups
Southern hip hop groups
Gangsta rap groups
No Limit Records artists